Ogurjaly Sanctuary is a sanctuary (zakaznik) of Turkmenistan.

It is located on the Ogurchinskiy Island. It is part of Hazar Nature Reserve. It was established for semifree maintenance and livestock reproduction of gazelles.

External links
 Türkmenistanyň Tebigaty goramak ministrligi hakynda
 Hazar State Nature Reserve - UNESCO World Heritage Centre

Sanctuaries in Turkmenistan